The Czechoslovak Socialist Youth Union (SSM) was a mass organization which served as the youth wing of the Communist Party in the Czechoslovak Socialist Republic from 1970 to 1990. It existed alongside the Pioneer Organization, which was geared towards younger children who were expected to join the SSM in their teens. Membership stood at 1.6 million in 1982.

It was created as a successor to the Czechoslovak Union of Youth, which ceased to exist in the wake of the invasion of Czechoslovakia in 1968. It provided both physical and ideological education to the youth of Czechoslovakia, and membership was highly encouraged for career-minded young people. Recruitment was intense, especially in educational institutions, to the point that many of the organization's members were unenthusiastic about the communist cause, leading some to complain that even beatniks were allowed to join its ranks. The SSM was organized on national, regional, and local levels and operated a large number of educational, art, and sporting facilities. The SSM was dissolved at its final congress in January of 1990, following the Velvet Revolution and the fall of communism in Czechoslovakia.

See also
Youth organizations in Communist Czechoslovakia
Free German Youth
Komsomol

References

Youth organizations based in Czechoslovakia
Youth wings of communist parties
1990 disestablishments in Czechoslovakia